Mamadouba Toto Camara (died 23 August 2021) was a Guinean politician. He served as Chief of Staff of the Republic of Guinea Armed Forces and was  following the 2008 Guinean coup d'état.

Biography
Camara served as military attaché to the Embassy of Guinea, Washington, D.C. He then served as Vice-President of the National Council for Democracy and Development (CNDD), the militant group led by Moussa Dadis Camara who led the 2008 coup d'état. Weeks later, he was nominated to be Minister of Security and Civil Protection.

Camara was the CNDD's representative at the funeral of deposed President Lansana Conté on 26 December 2008. He then toured the neighboring countries of Mali, Guinea-Bissau, and Sierra Leone to seek support for the CNDD.

Mamadouba Toto Camara died on 23 August 2021 from COVID-19.

References

2021 deaths
Military attachés
Government ministers of Guinea
Military chiefs of staff
21st-century Guinean politicians
Guinean military personnel
Deaths from the COVID-19 pandemic in Guinea